The 1867 Iowa gubernatorial election was held on October 8, 1867. Republican nominee Samuel Merrill defeated Democratic nominee Charles Mason with 62.93% of the vote.

General election

Candidates
Samuel Merrill, Republican
Charles Mason, Democratic

Results

References

1867
Iowa